Brazil–Malaysia relations are foreign relations between Brazil and Malaysia. Brazil has an embassy in Kuala Lampur, and Malaysia has an embassy in Brasilia.

Economic relations 
Both countries are working closely in the economic sector with many Brazilian brands and companies eyeing the Malaysian market. As of 2012, Brazilian companies had invested a total of U$6 billion in Malaysia. 

The Brazilian mining company Vale has begun construction of an iron ore transfer center in Malaysia. 

Brazil remains one of the biggest arms sellers as well as a major exporter of sugar and beef to Malaysia. While in Brazil, Malaysian oil company Petronas has signed a deal with OGX. Both countries are also in the process of joint ventures to develop biofuel, and Malaysia is pursuing the opportunities to assist Brazil in the planned expansion of broadband internet access throughout the country.

Further reading 
 Malaysia to share success secret with Brazil New Straits Times

References 

 
Malaysia
Bilateral relations of Malaysia